Nationality words link to articles with information on the nation's poetry or literature (for instance, Irish or France).

Events
 June 1 & June 5 – The first and (modified) second lines respectively of Paul Verlaine's 1866 poem Chanson d'automne (Les sanglots longs des violons de l'automne / Bercent mon cœur d'une langueur monotone.) are broadcast by the Allies over BBC Radio Londres among coded messages to the French Resistance to prepare for the D-Day landings (second broadcast at 22:15 local time). In the ensuing Invasion of Normandy English soldier-poet Keith Douglas is killed; Vernon Scannell (as John Bain) experiences the incident that gives rise to the poem "Walking Wounded" (1965) and is wounded; and, during lulls in the fighting, Dennis B. Wilson is writing the poem that will be published as Elegy of a Common Soldier in 2012.
 October 2 – Dylan Thomas is best man at the wedding of his friend and fellow Welsh poet Vernon Watkins in London - but fails to turn up.

Works published in English
Listed by nation where the work was first published and again by the poet's native land, if different; substantially revised works listed separately:

Canada
 E. K. Brown, On Canadian Poetry, revised edition (scholarship), Canada
 Ralph Gustafson, editor, Canadian Accent, anthology
 A. M. Klein:
 The Hitleriad
 Poems
Dorothy Livesay, Day and Night. Toronto: Ryerson. Governor General's Award 1944.
 E. J. Pratt, Collected Poems of E. J. Pratt, Toronto: Macmillan.
 Ronald Hambleton, editor Unit of five: Louis Dudek, Ronald Hambleton, P. K. Page, Raymond Souster, James Wreford, anthology, Toronto: Ryerson Press, Canada

India, in English
 Harindranath Chattopadhyay:
 Blood of Stones ( Poetry in English ), including "On the Pavement of Calcutta", a realistic description of suffering in the Bengal famine of 1943; Bombay: Padma Publications
 Lyrics ( Poetry in English ), Bombay: Padma Publications
 Nolini Kanta Gupta, To the Height ( Poetry in English ),
 Humayun Kabir, Mahatma and Other Poems( Poetry in English ); except for the title poem "Mahatama", inspired by the Quit India Movement, and "Rabindranath Tagore", the other poems are reprinted from the author's Poems 1932
 Fredoon Kabraji, A Minor Georgian's Swan Song ( Poetry in English ), Publisher: Basil Blackwell, Indian poet published in the United Kingdom
 P. R. Kaikini, Look On Undaunted ( Poetry in English ), Bombay
 H. D. Sethna, Struggling Heights ( Poetry in English ), Bombay: Karnatak Publishing House
 Subho Tagore:
 Flames of Passion ( Poetry in English ), love poems in verse and in the form of prose poems; Calcutta: Susil Gupta Ltd.
 Rubble, translated by Nilima Devi into English from the original Bengali; Calcutta: The Futurist Publishing House

United Kingdom
 Drummond Allison, The Yellow Night: Poems 1940-41-42-43, posthumous
 W. H. Auden, For the Time Being: A Christmas Oratorio, English poet living and publishing in the United States
 George Barker, Eros in Dogma
 Laurence Binyon, The Burning of the Leaves, and Other Poems
 John Betjeman, New Bats in Old Belfries
 Laurence Binyon, The Burning of the Leaves, and Other Poems
 Edmund Blunden, Shells by a Stream
 Alex Comfort, Elegies
 Crown and Sickle poetry anthology in Britain, featuring poets in the New Apocalyptics movement
 Walter De la Mare, Collected Rhymes and Verses
 Patric Dickinson, The Seven Days of Jericho
 T. S. Eliot, Four Quartets, contains "Burnt Norton" (first published 1936 and again 1941), "East Coker" (1940), "The Dry Salvages" (1941), "Little Gidding" (1942)
 Roy Fuller, A Lost Season
 W. S. Graham, The Seven Journeys
 Robert Greacen, Northern Harvest and One Recent Evening, Northern Ireland poet
 J. F. Hendry, and Henry Treece, editors, The Crown and Sickle, anthology
 Laurie Lee, The Sun My Monument
 John Lehmann, The Sphere of Glass, and Other Poems
 Louis MacNeice, Springboard
 R. P. L. Mogg, For This Alone, and Other Poems
 Mervyn Peake, Rhymes Without Reason
 John Pudney, Almanack of Hope
 Herbert Read, A World Within a War
 Lynette Roberts, Poems
 E. J. Scovell, Shadows of Chrysanthemums, and Other Poems
 William Soutar, The Expectant Silence
 A. P. Wavell (comp.), Other Men's Flowers, anthology
 Charles Williams, The Region of the Summer Stars

United States
 Franklin P. Adams, Nods and Becks
 Conrad Aiken, The Soldier
 W. H. Auden, For the Time Being
 E. E. Cummings, 1 X 1
 Babette Deutsch, Take Them, Stranger
 Hilda Doolittle, writing under the pen name "H.D.", The Walls Do Not Fall, first part of Trilogy (1944–46) on the blitz in war-time London
 Stanley J. Kunitz, Passport to the War
 Robert Lowell, Land of Unlikeness, Cummington, Massachusetts: Cummington Press
 William Meredith, Love Letter from an Impossible Land
 Marianne Moore, Nevertheless
 Kenneth Rexroth, The Phoenix and the Tortoise
 Muriel Rukeyser, Beast in View
 Karl Shapiro, V-Letter and Other Poems
 Jesse Stuart, Album of Destiny
 Mark Van Doren, Seven Sleepers
 Louise Varèse, translator, Eloges and Other Poems, translated from the original French of Saint-John Perse; introduction by Archibald MacLeish, New York: Norton
 Robert Penn Warren, Selected Poems, 1923—1943
 William Carlos Williams:
 Collected Later Poems
 The Wedge

Other in English
 James K. Baxter, Beyond the Palisade, his first volume of poetry, New Zealand
 Seaforth Mackenzie, The Moonlit Doorway, Sydney: Angus and Robertson; Australia
 Kenneth Slessor, One Hundred Poems, 1919-1939, Sydney: Angus and Robertson, Australia

Works published in other languages
Listed by nation where the work was first published and again by the poet's native land, if different; substantially revised works listed separately:

France
 Jean Cassou, Trente-trois sonnets composes au secret
 Robert Desnos, Contrée
 Paul Éluard, Au Rendez-vous allemand
 Pierre Jean Jouve, Pour les Ombres Lausanne, Switzerland: Cahiers de Poésie French poet published in Switzerland
 Alphonse Métérié, Les Cantiques du Frère Michel
 Saint-John Perse, French poet published in his native language while in exile in Argentina:
 Pluies, Buenos Aires: Les Editions Lettres Françaises (republished in Exil, suivi de Poème à l'étrangère; Pluies; Neiges Paris: Gallimard 1945)
 Quatre poèmes, 1941-1944, Buenos Aires: Les Editions Lettres Françaises (republished as Exil, suivi de Poème à l'étrangère; Pluies; Neiges Paris: Gallimard 1945)

Indian subcontinent
Including all of the British colonies that later became India, Pakistan, Bangladesh, Sri Lanka and Nepal. Listed alphabetically by first name, regardless of surname:

Gujarati
 Badarayan, Kedi
 Umashankar Joshi, Prachina, a "dialogue-poem"

Hindi
 Anchala Rameshvar Shukla, Lal Cunar, lyrics celebrating love, youth and revolt
 Girija Kumar Mathur, Manjir, many of these poems have themes of nature and intense love
 Rangeya Raghav, Ajeya Khandhar, pragativadi-movement poetry about the battle of Stalingrad, depicted to illustrate the human struggle for freedom
 Shyam Narayan Pandey, Jauhar, depicting the self-sacrifice of Padmini, queen of Chittor, written in a folk style

Other Indian languages
 A. N. Krishna Rao, Pragati Sila Sahitya, 15 essays in Kannada on the Pragatisila Caluvali (progressive movement) in Indian literature
 Bhimaraj Bhambiru, also known as "Mangal"; Mumgha Moti, written in doha form, the poems are addressed to an individual Mangala; Rajasthani-language
 Joseph Mundasseri, written in Malayalam-language:
 Manadandam, criticism about Indian classical literature, particularly Kalidasa
 Mattoli, a comparison of three major works of poetry: Kumaran Asan's Karuna, Vallathol's Magdalana Mariyam and Ulloor's Pingala
 K. V. Puttappa, also known as "Kuvempu", Kogile Mattu Soviet Russia, verses with a focus on the common man, which was pioneering for Kannada poetry of the time; a recurring theme in the poems is rejection of institutionalized religion
 Kshama Rao, Miralahari, Khanda Kavya poetry on Meera, the medieval Indian saint-poet; Sanskrit-language
 Mahjoor, Kalam-e-Mahjoor "No. 8", Kashmiri-language ghazals and vatsan's
 Mohammad Jamil Ahmad, Tazkirah-yi Sha'irat-i Urdu, literary criticism of Urdu-language women poets, with biographical information and selections from their poems
 Mohammad Mujib, Insha, adab aur adib, Urdu essays in literary criticism
 Prabhjot Kaur, Palkan Ohle, love poems; Punjabi-language
 Shrikrishna Powale, Agniparag; Marathi-language
 Va. Ramaswamy Ayyangar, Makakavi Paratiyar, Tamil biography of the Tamil poet Bharati

Spanish language
 Delmira Agustini, Poesías, posthumously published (died 1914), prologue by Luisa Luisi (Montevideo, Claudio García & Co., Uruguay
 Vicente Aleixandre, Sombra del paraíso ("Shadows of Paradise"); Spain
 César Moro, pen name of César Quíspez Asín, Lettre d'amour, Peru
 Stella Sierra, Canciones de mar y luna ("Songs of Sea and Moon"), Panama

Other languages
 Nathan Alterman, Plague Poems, Israel
 Nizar Qabbani, The Brunette Told Me, Syrian poet writing in Arabic
 Giorgos Seferis, Ημερολόγιο Καταστρώματος ΙΙ ("Deck Diary II"), Greece

Awards and honors
 Consultant in Poetry to the Library of Congress (later the post would be called "Poet Laureate Consultant in Poetry to the Library of Congress"): Robert Penn Warren appointed this year. He would serve until 1945.
 Governor General's Award, poetry or drama: Day and Night, Dorothy Livesay (Canada)

Births
Death years link to the corresponding "[year] in poetry" article:
 February 3 – Sandra Alcosser, American
 February 9 – Alice Walker, African-American novelist, poet, writer and feminist
 March 9 – Ndoc Gjetja (died 2010), Albanian poet and magazine editor
 March 21 – Pedro Pietri (died 2004), Puerto Rican and Nuyorican poet and playwright, co-founder of Nuyorican Poets Cafe
 April 18 – Kathy Acker (died 1997), American postmodernist experimental novelist and punk poet
 July 18 – Wayne Brown (died 2009), Caribbean (Trinidadian-born)
 July 24 – Jalal Mansur Nuriddin (died 2018), American rap poet and musician
 August 4 – Penn Kemp, Canadian poet, novelist, playwright and sound poet
 August 22 – Tom Leonard (died 2018), Scottish
 August 25
 Margaret Gibson (died 1999), African-American
 Sherley Anne Williams, African-American
 August 31 – Lorenzo Thomas, American
 September 24 – Eavan Boland (died 2020), Irish
 September 25 – bpNichol, Canadian
 October 10 – Linda Rogers, Canadian poet and children's writer
 October 12 – Lewis MacAdams, American poet, journalist and activist, founder of Friends of The Los Angeles River (FoLAR) in 1985
 October 16 – Paul Durcan, Irish
 November 24 – Jules Deelder (died 2019), Dutch
 November 25 – Kathryn Stripling Byer (died 2017), American poet, teacher; North Carolina Poet Laureate, 2005–2009
 December 3 – Craig Raine, English poet and critic
 December 10 – Carol Rumens, English poet, writer, literary editor and academic
 December 18 – Michael Davidson, American
 Also:
 David Constantine, English poet, translator, editor and academic
 Susan Ioannou, Canadian
 Mary Kinzie, American
 Patrick O'Connell (died 2005), Canadian
 Jergen Theobaldy, German
 Tim Thorne (died 2021), Tasmanian

Deaths
Birth years link to the corresponding "[year] in poetry" article:
 January 7 – Napoleon Lapathiotis (born 1888), Greek poet
 January 19 – Frederick George Scott (born 1861), Canadian poet
 February 9 – Agnes Mary Frances Duclaux (born 1857), English-born poet and biographer
 February 12 – Olive Custance, Lady Alfred Douglas (born 1874), English poet
 February 23 – Augusta Peaux (born 1859), Dutch poet
 March 5 – Alun Lewis (born 1915), Anglo-Welsh school poet and war poet died on active service in Burma
 March 28 – Stephen Leacock (born 1869), Canadian writer and economist
 April 4 – John Peale Bishop (born 1892), American poet and man of letters
 May 22 – William Ellery Leonard (born 1876), American poet and academic
 June 5 – (Doris) Capel Boake (born 1889), Australian writer
 June 9 – Keith Douglas (born 1920), English war poet died in World War II in the D-Day invasion of Normandy, killed by enemy mortar fire while his regiment is advancing from Bayeux and buried at the war cemetery at Tilly-sur-Seuilles
 June – Joseph Campbell (born 1879), Irish poet and lyricist
 July 3 – A. H. Reginald Buller (born 1874), British/Canadian mycologist mainly known as a researcher of fungi and wheat rust who also wrote limericks, some of which were published in Punch
 July 18 – Thomas Sturge Moore (born 1870), English poet, author and artist
 September 26 – Eunice Tietjens (born 1884), American poet, novelist, journalist, children's author, lecturer and editor
 September 30 – Baroness Gertrud von Puttkamer, writing as Marie-Madeleine (born 1881), German homoerotic poet, dies in a Nazi sanatorium
 October 2 or 3 – Benjamin Fondane (born 1898), Romanian-French Symbolist poet, critic and existentialist philosopher, gassed in Auschwitz concentration camp
 November 22 – Sadakichi Hartmann (born 1867), American art critic and poet
 November 24 – Jun Tsuji 辻 潤 (born 1884), Japanese author, poet, essayist, translator, musician and bohemian
 December 17 – Robert Nichols (born 1893), English war poet and dramatist
 Also:
 Olivia Ward Bush-Banks (born 1869), African and Native American poet and journalist
 K. V. Simon (born 1883), Indian, Malayalam-language poet
 David Vogel (born 1891), Hebrew poet, gassed in Auschwitz concentration camp

See also

 Poetry
 List of poetry awards
 List of years in poetry

Notes

20th-century poetry
Poetry